Jeziora Wielkie  is a village in Mogilno County, Kuyavian-Pomeranian Voivodeship, in north-central Poland. It is the seat of the gmina (administrative district) called Gmina Jeziora Wielkie.

The village has a population of 560.

References

Jeziora Wielkie